The German plan for a land invasion of England in 1940 was code-named Operation Sea Lion (Unternehmen Seelöwe in German). This is the Operation Sea Lion order of battle for the modified German plan produced on 30 August, 1940.

German forces

Heeresgruppe A
Generalfeldmarschall Gerd von Rundstedt
 16.Armee — Generaloberst Ernst Busch

{|
|
First Wave
 XIII.Armee-Korps — General Heinrich-Gottfried von Vietinghoff genannt Scheel.
 17.Infanterie-Division
 35.Infanterie-Division
 Luftwaffe II./Flak-Regiment 14
 VII.Armee-Korps — Generaloberst Eugen Ritter von Schobert
 1.Gebirgs-Division
 7.Infanterie-Division
 Luftwaffe I./Flak-Regiment 26

Second Wave
 V.Armee-Korps — General Richard Ruoff
 12.Infanterie-Division
 30.Infanterie-Division
 XXXXI.Armee-Korps — General der Panzertruppen Georg-Hans Reinhardt
 8.Panzer-Division
 10.Panzer-Division
 29.Infanterie-Division (mot.)
 Infanterie-Regiment (mot.) Großdeutschland
 Infanterie-Regiment Leibstandarte SS Adolf Hitler (mot)

Third Wave
 IV. Armee-Korps — General Viktor von Schwedler
 24.Infanterie-Division
 58.Infanterie-Division
 XXXXII.Armee-Korps — General Walter Kuntze
 45.Infanterie-Division
 164.Infanterie-Division
|}
 9.Armee — Generaloberst Adolf Strauss

{|
|
First Wave
 XXXVIII.Armee-Korps — General Erich von Manstein
 26.Infanterie-Division
 34.Infanterie-Division
 VIII.Armee-Korps — General Walter Heitz
 6.Gebirgs-Division
 8.Infanterie-Division
 28.Infanterie-Division

Second Wave
 XV.Armee-Korps — Generaloberst Hermann Hoth
 4.Panzer-Division
 7.Panzer-Division
 20.Infanterie-Division (mot.)

Third Wave
 XXIV.Armee-Korps General Leo Freiherr Geyr von Schweppenburg
 15.Infanterie-Division
 78.Infanterie-Division
|}

Heeresgruppe C
Generalfeldmarschall Wilhelm Ritter von Leeb
 6.Armee — Generalfeldmarschall Walther von Reichenau
{|
|
 II.Armee-Korps — General Walter Graf von Brockdorff-Ahlefeldt
 6.Infanterie-Division
 256.Infanterie-Division
 Airborne Formations General Kurt Student
 7.Flieger-Division
 22.Infanterie-Division (Luftlande)
 Bau-Lehr-Regiment z.b.V. 800 Brandenburg
|}

British forces

Home Forces
General Alan Brooke
Chief of Staff: Lieutenant-General Bernard Paget

{|
|
 38th (Welsh) Infantry Division
 21st Army Tank Brigade
 IV Corps — Lieutenant General Francis Nosworthy
 2nd Armoured Division
 42nd (East Lancashire) Infantry Division
 31st Independent Infantry Brigade Group
 VII Corps — Lieutenant General Andrew McNaughton of Canada
 1st Armoured Division
 1st Canadian Infantry Division
 1st Army Tank Brigade
|}
 Northern Command — Lieutenant General Ronald Forbes Adam
{|
|
 I Corps — Lieutenant General Harold Alexander
 1st Infantry Division
 2nd Infantry Division
 45th Infantry Division
 X Corps — Lieutenant General William Holmes
 54th (East Anglian) Infantry Division
 59th (Staffordshire) Infantry Division
|}
 London District — Lieutenant General Bertram Sergison-Brooke
 20th Independent Infantry Brigade (Guards)
 24th Guards Brigade Group
 3rd London Infantry Brigade
 Eastern Command — Lieutenant General Laurence Carr
{|
|
 II Corps — Lieutenant General Edmund Osborne
 18th Infantry Division
 52nd (Lowland) Infantry Division
 37th Independent Infantry Brigade
 XI Corps — Lieutenant General Hugh Massy
 15th (Scottish) Infantry Division
 55th (West Lancashire) Infantry Division
 XII Corps — Lieutenant General Andrew Thorne
 1st London Infantry Division
 43rd (Wessex) Infantry Division
 New Zealand Division
 1st Motor Machine Gun Brigade
 29th Independent Infantry Brigade
|}
 Southern Command — Lieutenant General Claude Auchinleck
{|
|
 V Corps — Lieutenant General Bernard Montgomery
 3rd Infantry Division
 4th Infantry Division
 50th (Northumbrian) Infantry Division
 VIII Corps — Lieutenant General Harold Franklyn
 48th (South Midland) Infantry Division
 70th Independent Infantry Brigade
 Australian force in the UK (later 9th Division) — Major General Henry Wynter 
 18th Australian Infantry Brigade (Southern Command Striking Force)
 25th Australian Infantry Brigade
|}
 Western Command — General Robert Gordon-Finlayson
{|
|
 2nd London Infantry Division
 III Corps — Lieutenant General James Marshall-Cornwall
 5th Infantry Division
 3rd Motor Machine Gun Brigade
 36th Independent Infantry Brigade
|}
 Scottish Command — Lieutenant General Harold Carrington
{|
|
 46th Infantry Division
 51st (Highland) Infantry Division
|}

References

External links
 Order of battle - Unternehmen Seelöwe (Sealion)
 Order of Battle - British Home Forces

World War II orders of battle